This article aims to give a historical outline of liberalism in Germany. The liberal parties dealt with in the timeline below are, largely, those which received sufficient support at one time or another to have been represented in parliament. Not all parties so included, however, necessarily labeled themselves "liberal". The sign ⇒ denotes another party in that scheme.

Background
The early high points of liberalism in Germany were the Hambacher Fest (1832) and the Revolutions of 1848 in the German states.
In the Frankfurt Parliament National Assembly in the Frankfurt am Main Frankfurt Paulskirche (1848/1849), the bourgeois liberal factions Casino and Württemberger Hof (the latter led by Heinrich von Gagern) were the majority. They favored a constitutional monarchy, popular sovereignty, and parliamentary rule.
Organized liberalism developed in the 1860s, combining the previous liberal and democratic currents. Between 1867 and 1933 liberalism was divided into progressive liberal and national liberal factions. Since 1945 only one liberal party has been significant in politics at the national level: The Free Democratic Party (Freie Demokratische Partei, FDP).

History

Pre 1860s

From German Progress Party to German State Party
 1861: Liberals united in the German Progress Party (Deutsche Fortschrittspartei)
 1867: The moderate faction seceded as the ⇒ National Liberal Party
 1868: A radical South German faction seceded as the ⇒ Democratic People's Party
 1884: The party merged with the ⇒ Liberal Union into the German Freeminded Party (Deutsche Freisinnige Partei)
 1893: The party split in the Freeminded People's Party (Freisinnige Volkspartei) and the ⇒ Freeminded Union (Freisinnige Vereinigung)
 1910: The FVP merged with the ⇒ Freeminded Union and the ⇒ German People's Party into the Progressive People's Party (Fortschrittliche Volkspartei)
 1918: The party is reorganised into the German Democratic Party (Deutsche Demokratische Partei), incorporating parts of the ⇒ National Liberal Party
 1930: The DDP in an attempt to survive reorganised itself into the German State Party (Deutsche Staatspartei)
 1933: The party is forced to dissolve itself

German People's Party (1868)
 1868: A radical faction of the ⇒ German Progress Party formed the  German People's Party (Deutsche Volkspartei)
 1910: The DVP merged into the ⇒ Progressive People's Party

National Liberal Party / German People's Party (1918)
National Liberals
 1867: A right-wing faction of the ⇒ German Progress Party formed the National Liberal Party (Nationalliberale Partei)
 1871: A conservative faction of NLP formed the Imperial Liberal Party (Liberale Reichspartei)
 1880: A left-wing faction seceded as the ⇒ Liberal Union
 1918: The NLP is reorganised into the German People's Party (Deutsche Volkspartei), part of the party joined the German Democratic Party
 1933: The party is dissolved

Liberal Union
 1880: A left-wing faction of the ⇒ National Liberal Party formed the Liberal Union (Liberale Vereinigung)
 1884: The party merged with the ⇒ German Progress Party into the ⇒ German Freeminded Party

Freeminded Union
 1893: The ⇒ German Freeminded Party split into the Freeminded Union (Freisinnige Vereinigung) and the ⇒ Freeminded People's Party
 1903: The ⇒ National Social Union joined the Freeminded Union
 1908: A left-wing faction seceded as the ⇒ Democratic Union
 1910: The party merged into the ⇒ Progressive People's Party

National Social Union
 1896: The National Social Union (Nationalsozialer Verein) is formed
 1903: The party is dissolved and members joined the ⇒ Freeminded Union

Democratic Union
 1908: A left-wing faction of the ⇒ Freeminded Union formed the Democratic Union (Demokratische Vereinigung)
 1918: The remnants of the Union joined the German Democratic Party

From Liberal Democratic Party of Germany to Alliance of Free Democrats (GDR)
 1945: Liberals in East Germany re-organised themselves into the Liberal Democratic Party of Germany (Liberal-Demokratische Partei Deutschlands). Since 1949 the party is under control of the communist dictatorship
 1990: The LDPD regained its liberal profile and shortened its name in February into Liberal Democratic Party (Liberal-Demokratische Partei). The same month it joined the newly founded Free Democratic Party (GDR) (Freie Demokratische Partei (DDR)) and the German Forum Party (Deutsche Forumpartei)  into Association of Free Democrats (Bund Freier Demokraten). In March the Association of Free Democrats absorbed the National Democratic Party of Germany (Nationaldemokratische Partei Deutschlands), and finally in August it merged into present-day ⇒ Free Democratic Party

Free Democratic Party
 1945–1946: Liberals in West Germany re-organised themselves in regional parties
 1948: The regional liberal parties merged into the Free Democratic Party (Freie Demokratische Partei)
 1956: A conservative faction seceded and formed the Free People's Party (Germany) (Freie Volkspartei). FDP is initially a hardright party well to the right of CDU
 1982: A left-wing faction seceded as the ⇒ Liberal Democrats
 1990: The FDP incorporated the ⇒ Association of Free Democrats

Liberal Democrats
 1982: A left-wing faction of the ⇒ Free Democratic Party formed the present-day Liberal Democrats (Liberale Demokraten), without success

New Liberals
 2014: A left-wing faction of the ⇒ Free Democratic Party formed the present-day New Liberals (Neue Liberale), contested in Hamburg state election 2015
 2021: The party was dissolved, formed into an association and members were urged to join Volt Deutschland

Liberal leaders
 Liberals before 1918: Eduard Lasker (1829–1884); Rudolf von Bennigsen – Hans Victor von Unruh – Eugen Richter
 Freisinn: Theodor Barth – Friedrich Naumann – Max Weber
 Deutsche Demokratische Partei: Walther Rathenau – Theodor Heuss
 Deutsche Volkspartei: Gustav Stresemann
 LDPD (East-Germany): Waldemar Koch, Wilhelm Külz, Manfred Gerlach
 Freie Demokratische Partei: Ralf Dahrendorf – Karl-Hermann Flach – Hans-Dietrich Genscher – Otto Graf Lambsdorff – Walter Scheel – Guido Westerwelle – Christian Lindner

Liberal thinkers
In the Contributions to liberal theory the following German thinkers are included:
 Immanuel Kant (1724–1804)
 August Ludwig von Schlözer (1735–1809)
 Wilhelm von Humboldt (1767–1835)
 Ludwig Joseph Brentano (1844–1931)
 Friedrich Naumann (1860–1919)
 Max Weber (1864–1920)
 Walther Rathenau (1867–1922)
 Adolf von Harnack (1851–1930)
 Wilhelm Röpke (1899–1966)
 Ralf Dahrendorf (1929–2009)

See also
 History of Germany
 Politics of Germany
 List of political parties in Germany
 Weber and German politics

Further reading
 Åberg, Martin. Swedish and German Liberalism: From Factions to Parties 1860–1920 (2011)
 Anderson, Margaret Lavinia. Practicing democracy: Elections and political culture in Imperial Germany (2000)
 
 Eyck, F. Gunther. "English and French Influences on German Liberalism before 1848." Journal of the History of Ideas (1957): 313–341. in JSTOR
 Gross, Michael B. The war against Catholicism: Liberalism and the anti-Catholic imagination in nineteenth-century Germany (University of Michigan Press, 2004)
 Harris, James F. A study in the theory and practice of German liberalism: Eduard Lasker, 1829–1884 (University Press of America, 1984)
 Jarausch, Konrad, et al. eds. In search of a liberal Germany: studies in the history of German liberalism from 1789 to the present (1990), essays by scholars
 Jones, Larry Eugene. German liberalism and the dissolution of the Weimar party system, 1918–1933 (University of North Carolina Press, 1988)
 Krieger, Leonard. The German idea of freedom: History of a political tradition (University of Chicago Press, 1957)
 Kurlander, Eric. The price of exclusion: ethnicity, national identity, and the decline of German liberalism, 1898–1933 (Berghahn Books, 2006)
 Langewiesche, Dieter. Liberalism in Germany (Macmillan Press, 2000)
 Kwan, Jonathan. Liberalism and the Habsburg Monarchy, 1861–1895 (Palgrave Macmillan, 2013), Concerns the Austro-Hungarian Empire
 Langewiesche, Dieter. Liberalism in Germany (2000)
 Mork, Gordon R. "Bismarck and the 'Capitulation' of German Liberalism," Journal of Modern History (1971) 43#1 pp. 59–75 in JSTOR
 Palmowski, Jan. "Mediating the nation: liberalism and the polity in nineteenth-century Germany." German History (2001) 19#4 pp. 573–598.
 Palmowski, Jan. Urban liberalism in imperial Germany: Frankfurt am Main, 1866–1914 (Oxford University Press, 1999)
 Sheehan, James J. "Liberalism and society in Germany, 1815–48." Journal of Modern History (1973): 583–604. in JSTOR
 Sheehan, James J. German liberalism in the nineteenth century (1995)
 Sheehan, James J. "Liberalism and the city in nineteenth-century Germany." Past and Present (1971): 116–137. in JSTOR
 Sheehan, James J. The career of Lujo Brentano: a study of liberalism and social reform in imperial Germany (University of Chicago Press, 1966)

 
Germany